= La Passerelle-I.D.É. =

- Type: Francophone not-for-profit
- Founded: 1992
- Founder: Léonie Tchatat
- Headquarters: 2 Carlton St, Toronto, ON M5B 1J3
- Area served: Toronto and Ontario
- Services: Immigration integration and economic development
- Website: passerelle-ide.com

La Passerelle-I.D.É (Intégration et Développement Économique) is a Canadian Franco-Ontarian not-for-profit organization based in Toronto, ON, devoted to the integration and economic development of Francophone immigrants, with a special emphasis on visible minorities. The organization is focused on building bridges between forward thinking private sector companies and talented Francophone newcomers.

== History ==
In 1993, the organization began as an informal network of young Francophone immigrant women in Toronto responding to systemic issues in the education system. La Passerelle-I.D.É. grew out of that early advocacy and was founded in 1992 by Léonie Tchatat at the age of 16 to respond to a wide range of barriers to the economic, social and civic integration of new immigrants to Toronto. As a young female, francophone immigrant Léonie understood first-hand that the unemployment, underemployment and precarious employment of Francophone new immigrants presented a huge opportunity cost for the province and the country.

== Leadership ==
La Passerelle-I.D.É. is led by its president and founder, Léonie Tchatat, who arrived in Canada as a student in the 1990s. Now a Canadian citizen, this Franco-Ontarian of Cameroonian origin has been recognized by governments, institutions and francophone communities across Canada and internationally for her work on issues of inclusiveness, multiculturalism and innovation.

== Programs and Services ==
La Passerelle-I.D.É. provides prospective employers with access to a range of bilingual and diverse talent. The organization provides cultural competencies skills training designed to prepare newcomers and immigrants workers for the realities of Canadian workplace cultures and employers with an increased capacity for diversity integration.

The organization also provides a number of targeted programs designed to address the systemic barriers to integration and also for professional development. It has led province-wide campaigns in collaboration with the provincial and federal governments on the added value that Francophone workers provide and has contributed to the development of public policies on immigration and integration.

La Passerelle-I.D.É. played a major role in the founding of the Francophone Workplace Development Council, a high-level, cross-sectoral advisory body that works to identify strategies to expand and strengthen the Francophone bilingual talent pipeline. The Council engages private sector, government, and education stakeholders to build a greater awareness of the positive impact that Francophone bilingual talent could play in the economic development of the GTHA region.

== Awards and Recognitions ==
Throughout the 25 years of her contribution in the community, Léonie Tchatat's work has been recognized by several organizations.

She is considered a leader by governments, institutions and francophone communities in Canada, and has been awarded several prizes and distinctions.

- In 2002, she founded the magazine Taloua.
- In 1997, she received the Youth Award by Skills for Change, her efforts were also recognized by Jean Chrétien, ex-premier of Canada.
- In 1999, she received the Certificate of Appreciation Earth day by the Groupe jeunesse francophone de Toronto.
- In 2005, she is the recipient of the rank of Chevalier by The Order of the Pleiades in 2005.
- In 2007, she received the African Hope Certificate of Appreciation.
- In 2014, she received Le prix anniverssaire de l’Association des enseignantes et des enseignants Franco-ontariens acknowledging her engagement in the community.
- In 2014, she was given the Leadership Award by Share the Light Award Northwood Neighbourhood Services.
- Léonie Tchatat received an Afroglobal award in 2017 for her work in social development .
- In November 2011 and February 2015 respectively, Léonie Tchatat launched major public awareness campaigns on the contribution of Francophone immigrants to Ontario entitled « Immigrant veut dire : une francophonie ontarienne plus forte ! » and « Immigrant francophone veut dire : ensemble pour un Ontario français prospère! ».

== Controversy ==
In 2019, the Toronto Star published articles critical of the organization, including claiming that the La Passerelle-I.D.É. program “Sans Visages” was “bogus”. The program in question was designed and approved by the funder to address sensitive issues surrounding economic dependency by young francophone women from the visible minority community in at-risk communities. La Passerelle-I.D.É. sued the Toronto Star for defamation following the publication of this article.
